Paul Black may refer to:
Paul Black (musician) (born 1959), American singer and drummer
Paul Black (Scottish footballer) (born 1977), former footballer with Dundee United
Paul Black (English footballer) (born 1990), footballer with the Carolina RailHawks
Paul Black (author) (born 1957), American science fiction author
Paul Black (director) (born 1967), British-Canadian film director
Paul Black (educational researcher) (born 1930), British educational researcher